Diplomatic Immunity is a 1991 American action thriller film directed by Peter Maris, it is based on the novel The Stalker by Theodore Taylor.

Plot
U.S. Marine Cole Hickel (Boxleitner) vows revenge on the evil psychopath Klaus Hermann (Bresnahan), who has killed his daughter. Hermann has an obsession with murdering people and photographing their dead bodies. He also has diplomatic immunity as his mother, Gerta (Foster), is the President of Paraguay, and therefore he cannot be prosecuted by conventional means. Hickel travels to Paraguay and teams up with a smuggler named Cowboy (Drago) to take his own revenge. In the end, Hickel and Cowboy track Hermann to the presidential palace. Gerta fatally shoots Cowboy and gives the pistol to her son to kill Hickel. Cowboy, with his last breath, kills Gerta with a spear gun. Hermann flees and Hickel gives chase, killing many of Hermann's henchmen in the process. After CIA agents show up and stop Hickel, Hermann goes back to his mother's dead body to photograph her, only to be blown up by C-4 explosives hidden inside his camera by Hickel. At the airport, Paraguay officials try to arrest Hickel, but in a twist of irony, the CIA agent claims diplomatic immunity for Hickel.

Cast
Bruce Boxleitner as Cole Hickel
Billy Drago as Cowboy
Tom Bresnahan as Klaus Hermann
Meg Foster as Gerta Hermann
Robert Forster as Stonebridge
Robert DoQui as Ferguson
Ken Foree as Del Roy Gaines
Paul Napier as Kinnick
Sharon Case as Ellen Hickel 
Fabiana Udenio as Teresa Escobal
Matthias Hues as Gephardt

Production

Development
Diplomatic Immunity is based on the 1987 novel The Stalker by Theodore Taylor (who was mainly known as a children's author). One of the changes in the movie is the location of the action, which takes place in Europe in the book, but is moved to Paraguay for the movie.

It was produced, and released by the Fries Distribution Company, as well as Filmkompaniet Distribution in Norway; Highlight Video in Germany; Home Cinema Group in Australia; and Scanbox Norge in Norway.

References

External links

 

1991 films
American action thriller films
1991 action thriller films
Films based on American novels
American films about revenge
1990s English-language films
1990s American films